Wilson Bar USFS Airport  is a public-use U.S. Forest Service airport located eight nautical miles (9 mi, 15 km) south of the central business district of Dixie, in Idaho County, Idaho, United States. It is owned by the Nez Perce National Forest.

Facilities and aircraft 
It has one runway designated 6/24 with a turf surface measuring 1,500 by 50 feet (457 x 15 m). For the 12-month period ending June 24, 2011, the airport had 220 aircraft operations, an average of 18 per month: 91% general aviation and 9% air taxi.

References

External links 
 Topo map as of 1 July 1987 from USGS The National Map
 

Airports in Idaho
Transportation in Idaho County, Idaho
United States Forest Service